Shah Begum; ( 1570 – 5 May 1605) was the first wife and chief consort of Prince Salim (later Emperor Jahangir). She was known as Zan-i-Kalan being the first wife of Salim. She was a Rajput princess by birth and committed suicide shortly before the succession of her husband to the royal throne. She was the mother of the eldest daughter and son of Prince Salim, Sultan-un-Nissa Begum and Khusrau Mirza.

Family
Manbhawati Bai, known popularly as Maan Bai, was the daughter of Raja Bhagwant Das, the ruler of Amer. She was the granddaughter of Raja Bharmal and sister of Raja Man Singh and Raja Madho Singh. Furthermore, she was also a niece of Mariam-uz-Zamani who eventually became her mother-in-law as well. This would make her a maternal cousin of her husband, Prince Salim. Her marriage to Prince Salim was arranged by her aunt and mother-in-law Empress Mariam-uz-Zamani.

Marriage
At age fifteen, Salim was betrothed to his cousin, Rajkumari Man Bai. This marriage was fixed by the mother of Prince Salim, Empress Mariam-uz-Zamani. Akbarnaama quotes, "Rajah Bhagwan Das Kacchwaha, who held high office and who had lofty lineage and abilities, had a daughter whose purity adorned her high extraction and who was endowed with beauty and graces, and that it was the wish of her family that she should be united to the prince."  Akbar readily agreed to this match expressing that the bride belonged to the family having a "fine genetic pool". She was widely known for her beauty, high ideals, and principles.

The marriage settlement was fixed at two crore tankas. Akbar himself, accompanied by all his nobles numerous and diverse golden vessels set with precious stones, utensils of gold and silver, and all sorts of riches, the quantity of which is beyond all computation. The imperial nobles were presented with Persian, Turkish, and Arabian horses, with golden saddles. Along with the bride, were given several male and female slaves, of Indian, Abyssinian, and Circassian origin. As the Imperial procession returned along highways covered with rare and choice cloth, the Emperor scattered over the bridal litter, gold, and jewels in careless profusion. To honour her household which was the abode of the highest-ranking nobles of the Mughal court and was the paternal household of the chief consort of Akbar and mother of Prince Salim, Mariam-uz-Zamani, Akbar and Salim themselves carried the palanquin of the bride on their shoulders for some distance.

Nizamuddin remarks that she was considered to be the best and most suitable princess as the first wife of Prince Salim. Abul Fazl in Akbarnama illustrates her as a jewel of chastity and describes her as an extremely beautiful woman whose purity adorned her high extraction and was endowed with remarkable beauty and graces. 

The couple's first child was a daughter named Sultan-un-Nissa Begum, who was born on 25 April 1586 and died on 5 September 1646. She lived for sixty years. The couple's second child was a son named Khusrau Mirza, who was born on 16 August 1587. At his birth, Man Bai was bestowed the prestigious title of "Shah Begum" meaning "The royal lady".

With her fidelity and sincere devotion to Jahangir, she won a special place in his heart. Jahangir was extremely fond of her and had her designated as his chief consort in his princely days. Jahangir while referring to her death in his biography records his attachment and affection for her. "The lady [Shah Begum] was ever ambitious of an ascendancy over the other inmates of the harem, and grew violent at the slightest opposition of her will" said Inayatullah.

Shah Begum constantly advised Khusrau to be loyal to his father. When she saw that it was of no use, she decided to take her own life finding no way to reconcile father and son which was the token of her fidelity towards her husband, Salim.

Death
Shah Begum died on 5 May 1605. She was incapable of tolerating the misconduct of her son, and brother, Madho Singh towards Jahangir, which despaired her life in a circumstantial trauma. The constant complaints of Salim to Akbar about Khusrau had put her mind at the stage of confusion and filled her heart with melancholy. Further, gaining no success in pursuing Khusrao to be loving and loyal toward his father, she became overwhelmed with grief and this failure added to her woes. One day when Salim had gone on hunting, she stole away from her maids, consumed excess opium, and committed suicide. Jahangir was devastated over the news of her death and much to his grief didn't consume meals for four days. He was eventually pacified by his mother, Mariam-uz-Zamani.
 
Jahangir in his biography says, 

When Akbar was informed of Salim's state, he wrote him a letter of condolence so loving and compassionately and sent him a robe of honor and his turban that he at that moment was wearing to pacify his son. Akbar grieved the death of his daughter-in-law as he was very fond of her son, Khusrau Mirza. 

Jahangir in her honor ordered the construction of her tomb and entrusted it to Aqa Reza, the principal artist at Allahabad court. Shah Begum's tomb is located in Khusrau Bagh, Allahabad. It was completed in 1606-07.

Issue 
With Jahangir, Shah Begum had at least two children:
Sultan-un-Nissa (25 April 1586, Mughal Empire – 5 September 1646, Mughal Empire, buried in Tomb of Akbar, Sikandar, Agra) 
Khusrau Mirza (16 August 1587, Lahore, Mughal Empire – 26 January 1622, Deccan, Mughal Empire, buried in Mausoleum of Khusrau Mirza, Khusro Bagh, Allahabad)

In popular culture
Krutika Desai Khan essayed her role in the Indian television series Noorjahan, on Doordarshan. 
Neetha Shetty portrayed Shah Begum in EPIC channel Siyaasat (based on the Twentieth Wife).
Heli Daruwala portrayed her role in Colors Channel's Dastaan-E-Mohabbat Salim Anarkali
Jyotsna Chandola portrayed her role in Jodha Akbar on Zee TV. 
Anushka Luhar portrayed Man Bai in ZEE5's web series Taj: Divided by Blood.

See also
Kingdom of Amber
Khusro Bagh

References
https://books.google.dz/books?id=yeu9zQEACAAJ&dq=akbar:+the+great+mughal+:+the+definitive+biography+ira+mukhoty&hl=fr&sa=X&redir_esc=y

Bibliography

External links

1570s births
1605 deaths
Indian Hindus
People from Jaipur
16th-century Indian women
16th-century Indian people
Wives of Jahangir
Indian princesses
Rajput princesses
17th-century Indian women